ESSM Energija Elektrenai is an ice hockey team in Elektrenai, Lithuania. The club currently consists only of a junior team. They are the farm team of SC Energija.

History
ESSM Energija Elektrenai was founded in 2000. They were Lithuania Hockey League champions in 2012.

Achievements
Lithuanian champion (1): 2012.

References

External links
Team profile on eurohockey.com
Official website 

Ice hockey teams in Lithuania